The 1924–25 Huddersfield Town season saw Town retain their title for the second consecutive season. Under the guidance of Herbert Chapman, they won the title by 2 clear points from West Bromwich Albion. The mood suddenly changed at the end of the season when Chapman suddenly resigned.

Squad at the start of the season

Review
After winning their first title, Herbert Chapman's team didn't want to give their title back in a hurry, winning their first 4 games and being unbeaten for their 10 league games. Town's defensive line were particularly impressive, only conceding 28 goals during the league season and never conceded more than 2 in any league game. They only conceded 3 goals in their FA Cup game against Bolton Wanderers. They won their 2nd title by 2 points from West Bromwich Albion. However, Town were left bewildered when Herbert Chapman left for Arsenal at the end of the season.

Squad at the end of the season

Results

Division One

FA Cup

Appearances and goals

1924-25
English football clubs 1924–25 season
1925